The Manitoba electoral redistribution of 2008 started on April 14, 2008 when Manitoba's Electoral Divisions Boundaries Commission made up of Manitoba Chief Justice Richard J. Scott, Chief Electoral Officer Richard D. Balasko, President and Vice-Chancellor of the University College of the North Denise K. Henning, Dean of the Faculty of Arts and Professor of Political Studies at the University of Manitoba Richard Sigurdson, and President and Vice-Chancellor at Brandon University Louis Visentin released the population counts of the 1998 electoral boundaries based on Census 2006 population counts provided by Statistics Canada. The Pas was the only riding not to have its boundaries changed. The Electoral Divisions Boundaries Commission released its report after months of public consultation and deliberation.

The new boundaries first took effect in the 2011 election of the Manitoba Legislature.

New ridings

 Agassiz
 Dauphin
 Dawson Trail
 Fort Garry-Riverview
 Fort Richmond
 Kewatinook
 Logan
 Midland
 Morden-Winkler
 Riding Mountain
 Spruce Woods
 St. Paul
 Tyndall Park

References

M
Manitoba electoral districts
Manitoba Legislature
Man
2008 in Manitoba